DBA or dba may refer to:

Academic
 Doctor of Business Administration, a research-based doctorate degree

Science and technology

Biology and medicine
 Diamond–Blackfan anemia, a congenital medical condition
 Dilute, Brown and non-Agouti, a strain of laboratory mice developed by C. C. Little

Computing and telecommunication
 DarkBASIC (.dba format), a computer language and associated programming environment designed to simplify the creation of 3-D video games
 Database administration, a technical function concerned with the effective use and control of a particular database and of its related  applications
 Database administrator, a person responsible for the environmental aspects of a database
 Dynamic bandwidth allocation, a telecommunications algorithm

Other uses in science and technology
 Bolkhovitinov DB-A, a 1930s Soviet heavy bomber
 dB(A), a sound level unit in which different frequencies are weighted differently to account for the perception of the human ear
 Design basis accident, scenario in nuclear facilities
 Dibenzylideneacetone, an organic compound used as a sunscreen
 Double Bass Array, active absorption approach for low frequency sound reproduction
 Double bend achromat lattice, a magnetic lattice more commonly known as Chasman–Green lattice

Other uses
 De Bellis Antiquitatis, a tabletop wargame
 Dalbandin Airport IATA code
 Dallas Bar Association, a professional organization for lawyers in Dallas, Texas, U.S.
 DBA (airline), a former low-cost German airline
 Defense Base Act, type of insurance that covers employees at U.S. defense bases overseas
 Doing business as, a legal term related to the name a business uses
 The Barge Association, formerly "Dutch Barge Association" (DBA): a club for leisure users of European inland waterways.